As well as events for individuals, there was a Semi-Contact tournament for national teams at the W.A.K.O. World Championships 2007 in Coimbra. Each team consisted of four members – three men and one woman – with no weight categories, although fights were same-sex only (e.g. women faced women, men faced men).  There were thirteen teams from two continents (Europe and North America) taking part in the competition and each of the matches was four rounds of one minute each (each fighter on a team fought one round against the opposing team, with the women fighting last), fought under Semi-Contact rules.

Due to there not being enough teams for a tournament designed for sixteen, three of the teams had byes through to the quarter finals.  The tournament gold medallists were Team Great Britain who defeated Team Hungary in the final by points decision.  Team USA and Team Germany occupied the bronze medal spots.

Results

Key

See also
List of WAKO Amateur World Championships
List of WAKO Amateur European Championships
List of male kickboxers
List of female kickboxers

References

External links
 WAKO World Association of Kickboxing Organizations Official Site

Kickboxing events at the WAKO World Championships 2007 Coimbra
2007 in kickboxing
Kickboxing in Portugal